Arigato is an album by pianist Hank Jones recorded in 1976 for the Progressive label.

Reception

Allmusic awarded the album 4 stars, stating: "Over his many years as a performer, Hank Jones has established himself not only as a major force in jazz piano, but also nonpareil when it comes to the piano trio format. This 1976 recording does absolutely nothing to diminish his matchless status in the annals of that combination."

Track listing
 "Allen's Alley" (Denzil Best) - 4:48
 "I'm Old Fashioned" (Jerome Kern, Johnny Mercer) - 5:10
 "Night Sadness" (Gary McFarland) - 6:27
 "Arigato" (Hank Jones) - 2:56
 "Recapitulation" (Jones) - 6:03 Bonus track on CD reissue
 "Night Flight to Puerto Rico" (Ray Rivera) - 4:27 Bonus track on CD reissue
 "Double Deal" (Wes Montgomery) - 4:59 Bonus track on CD reissue
 "Majorca" (Rivera) - 6:54
 "What Am I Here For?" (Duke Ellington, Frankie Laine) - 5:00
 "Medley: The Bad and the Beautiful/But Beautiful/You Are Too Beautiful" (David Raksin/Jimmy Van Heusen, Johnny Burke/Lorenz Hart, Richard Rodgers) - 6:15
 "Gerry's Blues" (Milt Jackson) - 5:09

Personnel 
Hank Jones - piano
Richard Davis (tracks 1-4, 6 & 8-11) Jay Leonhart (tracks 5 & 7) - bass
Ronnie Bedford - drums
Ray Rivera - guitar (tracks 6 & 8)

References 

1977 albums
Hank Jones albums
Progressive Records albums